The Body may refer to:

Literature 
 The Body (short story), a short story by Camillo Boito
 The Body (novella), a novel written by Stephen King
 The Body (Sapir novel), a novel by Richard Sapir
 The Body (Kureishi novel), a novel by Hanif Kureishi
 The Body: An Essay, a 2002 book by Jenny Boully

Film and TV
 The Body (1970 film), a documentary about the human anatomy
 The Body (1974 film), a film starring Zeudi Araya and Carroll Baker
 The Body (2001 film), a film starring Antonio Banderas based on the book by Richard Sapir
 The Body (2012 film), a Spanish film
 The Body (2018 film), a Korean film
 The Body (2019 film), a Hindi film
 "The Body" (Buffy the Vampire Slayer), the sixteenth episode of the fifth season of Buffy the Vampire Slayer
"Chapter Four: The Body", the fourth episode of the first season of Stranger Things
 "The Body" (Into the Dark), an episode of the first season of Into the Dark
 "The Body" (American Horror Story), an episode of the eleventh season of American Horror Story

Music
 The Body (band), an American experimental metal band
 "The Body", a song by Public Image Ltd from the album Happy?

People 
 Joe Kopicki, an American NBA basketball player nicknamed "The Body"
 Marie McDonald, an American actress nicknamed "The Body"
 Elle Macpherson, an Australian supermodel nicknamed "The Body"
 Jesse Ventura, an American professional wrestler, actor, and politician nicknamed "The Body"
 Ben Wallace (basketball), an American NBA basketball player nicknamed "The Body"

See also 
 Body (disambiguation)